Mohammad Reza Khabushani also known as Naw'i Khabushani (1563–1610) was a Persian Poet of 16th and early 17th centuries. He was born in Khabushan, a city between Quchan and Nishapur in Khurasan Persia. He migrated to India and spent rest of his life and served Akbar, King of Mughal Empire and his son, Daniyal Mirza and he returned to Iran once before his permanent 
inhabitancy in India. He was pupil of Muhtasham Kashani.he has poems in various in various Poetry Forms such as Ghazal, Mathnawi and Qasida. his famous work is Suz o godāz (Burning and Melting). Moreover, he has another poetry book which its name is divān of Nawʿi.

Suz o Godaz 
Suz o Godaz means Burning and Melting and is famous work of Naw'i Khabushani. It consists of 492 Verse. This poem is about a girl who committed Sati after the death of her sweetheart.

References 

16th-century Persian-language poets
17th-century Persian-language poets
1563 births
1610 deaths
People from Quchan
Iranian emigrants to the Mughal Empire